Penha de França is a freguesia (civil parish) and typical quarter of Lisbon, the capital of Portugal. Located in the historic center of Lisbon, Penha de França is north of São Vicente, east of Arroios, south of Areeiro, and west of Beato. The population in 2011 was 27,967,

History

The Madre de Deus Convent was founded in 1509 by Queen Leonor of Viseu. It has housed the National Museum of the Azulejo since 1965.

The freguesia of Penha de França was created on April 13, 1918. 

In 1959 its area was reduced in order to create the parishes of Alto do Pina and São João. 

With the 2012 Administrative Reform, the latter merged with Penha de França and the new and larger parish kept its name.

Landmarks
National Museum of the Azulejo
Madre de Deus Convent
Nossa Senhora da Penha de França Church
Palace of the Marquises of Nisa
Alto de São João Cemetery

References

Parishes of Lisbon